Wilby is a village and former civil parish,  south west of Norwich, now in the parish of Quidenham, in the Breckland district, in the county of Norfolk, England. In 1931 the parish had a population of 94. Wilby has a church called All Saints.

History 
The name "Wilby" means 'Willow-tree farm/settlement' or 'willow-tree circle'. There are earthworks of Wilby deserted medieval village and there is evidence of Saxon occupation. Wilby was recorded in the Domesday Book as Wilebey/Wilgeby/Willebeih. On 1 April 1935 the parish was abolished and merged with Quidenham.

References

Villages in Norfolk
Former civil parishes in Norfolk
Quidenham